Symphonica is the 20th album by Joe Lovano to be released on Blue Note Records. The album was released in 2009 and features a live recording of a November 26, 2005, concert.

Track listing
 "Emperor Jones" – 6:11
 "Eternal Joy	Lovano" – 8:24
 "Duke Ellington's Sound of Love" – 12:15
 "Alexander the Great" – 11:51
 "His Dreams" – 8:04
 "The Dawn of Time" – 8:26
 "I'm All for You" – 9:25

Personnel
Rundfunk Orchestra
John Goldsby - bass
Michael Hofmann - bassoon
Hans Dekker - drums
Brigitte Schreiner - flute
Ricardo Almeida - French Horn
Alfons Gaisbauer - French Horn
Koji Paul Shigihara - electric guitar, soloist
Ulla Van Daelen - harp
Frank Chastenier - keyboards, Hammond organ, piano, soloist
Egmont Kraus - percussion
Michael Schmidt - percussion
Romanus Schöttler - percussion
Joe Lovano - tenor and soprano saxophone
Jens Neufang - baritone saxophone
Olivier Peters - tenor saxophone
Karolina Strassmayer - alto saxophone, soloist
Heiner Wiberny - alto saxophone
Mattis Cederberg - trombone
Dave Horler - trombone
Bernt Laukamp - trombone
Ingo Luis - trombone
Ludwig Nuss - trombone
Steve Singer - trombone
Rob Bruynen - trumpet
Andy Haderer - trumpet
John Marshall - trumpet
Klaus Osterloh - trumpet
Jürgen Schuster - trumpet
Johannes Chane Becker - viola
Bernhard Holker - viola

References

External links
 

2009 live albums
Joe Lovano live albums
Blue Note Records live albums